The Martins Pond Archeological Site is an archaeological site near Annapolis in Anne Arundel County, Maryland. It is a Middle-Late Woodland period site, with lithic, floral, and faunal remains.

It was listed on the National Register of Historic Places in 1975.

References

External links
, including photo from 1971, at Maryland Historical Trust

Archaeological sites in Anne Arundel County, Maryland
Archaeological sites on the National Register of Historic Places in Maryland
Native American history of Maryland
Woodland period
National Register of Historic Places in Anne Arundel County, Maryland